Steven Collins (16 September 1951 – 15 February 2018) was a British-born Buddhist studies scholar.

He earned a master's degree and doctorate from the University of Oxford and lectured at the University of Bristol before joining the University of Chicago faculty in 1991, where he was named the Chester D. Tripp Professor in the Humanities. Collins died in New Zealand, where he was attending a seminar, on 15 February 2018, at the age of 66.

References

1951 births
2018 deaths
Alumni of the University of Oxford
Academics of the University of Bristol
University of Chicago faculty
British scholars of Buddhism
University of Chicago Divinity School faculty